Bohermeen is a Roman Catholic parish in the Irish Diocese of Meath. Its English name is a corruption of an ancient Irish language name, An Bóthar Mín, which meant the smooth road. Originally one of the five famed ancient roadways that led from the mediaeval capital of Ireland, Tara, approximately 10 miles away cut through the area. The quality of the roadway, in an era of dirt-roads (which still exist today), earned for it the nickname of the smooth road, An Bóthar Mín.

History

For nearly fourteen hundred years the local area went by the name of Ard Braccan or Ardbraccan, meaning the height of Braccan, the hill on which St. Braccan located his mediaeval monastery and which in the 9th century became a diocese with its own bishop. Even when the diocese of Ardbraccan joined with other small dioceses such as Fore and Kells to form the Diocese of Meath, Braccan's hill became the location of the palace of the Bishop of Meath.

Following the establishment of the (Anglican) Church of Ireland Ardbraccan became the seat of the Protestant Lord Bishop of Meath. Anglican bishops continued to live in the area until 1958. When in the nineteenth century the Roman Catholic Church re-established a local parish in the area, it was decided to use a different name to the local Church of Ireland parish of Ardbraccan. 'Bohermeen' became the chosen name. A curate in the parish of Navan, the large town nearby, Dean Cogan, who himself had once served as a curate in Bohermeen, and who wrote the acclaimed History of the Diocese of Meath (2 volumes) in the 1860s bemoaned the choice of the secular Bohermeen (or Bohermien as he wrote it) as the parish name ahead of the more religious Ardbraccan name.

Population and landholdings

The area known as Bohermeen has had a predominantly Roman Catholic population according to every census done. It did however have a sizeable Church of Ireland population (see below), though that dwindled significantly in the 19th and 20th centuries. The population was hit to a minor extent by the Second Great Famine in the mid-19th century. Local folklorists record the disappearance of entire pre-famine settlements in, for example, the townland of Greetiagh within the parish. Though the records of the period are scant, folklore recorded anonymous deaths of parishioners in some of the ancient mediaeval graveyards, notably at Markiestown, where the last burials in the ancient (now destroyed) cemetery were believed to have occurred in the famine era.

The landholdings of the era were recorded as part of Griffith's Valuation, a major land survey carried out in Ireland between 1848 and 1864.

The major land reform of the late 19th century changed the landownership pattern. The breakup of the large estates of the gentry saw most parishioners move from being tenant farmers to small landowners in their own right.

As late as the 1930s a project carried out by the Irish Folklore Commission, in which school children were asked to write down their description of their areas, recorded that most houses in the area were thatched cottages. However almost all the traditional thatched houses were knocked down in succeeding decades. The last thatched house in the parish was demolished in the 1990s.

Environment
The parish of Bohermeen contains within its boundaries Faughan Hill, a relatively high hill on the flat plains of Meath, where it was claimed the ancient Irish king Niall of the Nine Hostages was buried. It also contains one of Ireland's most highly regarded Palladian country houses, Ardbraccan House, until 1885 the residence of the Church of Ireland Bishop of Meath.It also contains an ancient tower house known as Durhamstown Castle, which was once owned by the Earl of Essex, Queen Elizabeth I's Lord Deputy in Ireland, and which is still lived in.

St Ultan's Church
The main parish church, St. Ultan's, was first built in the pre-Catholic Emancipation era, in 1817. It was built in cruciform form.  The cultural and class divisions of 19th century Ireland were reflected in the usage of the building. In the aftermath of the Roman Catholic revival of the 1850s, Catholic social and gender mores were reflected in the usage of the building, with different sides of the aisle described by the community as men's and women's.

The building underwent periodic renovations. A new roof was added in 1897 while the wooden altar was replaced by a new set of marble altar, altar rails and reredos (all shown in the photograph above). A set of new stained glass windows were installed, notably a window of the crucifixion over the reredos and main altar.

The church was clumsily re-ordered in the aftermath of Vatican II. In the mid-1980s a complete rebuild of the church was undertaken. It was squared instead of remaining cruciform, with its high stained glass windows relocated. The reredos and altar rails were removed, while the tabernacle was re-located. The re-ordering remains somewhat controversial.

Organisation of the parish
Bohermeen parish itself consists of three sub-parishes; Bohermeen itself, Boyerstown and Cortown, each with their own church, St. Ultan's (formerly called St. Cuthbert's), St. Cuthbert's and Christ the King respectively. It covers an area once served by a large number of mediaeval parishes, including Moyaher, Killenagolach (later called Grange) and Markiestown (also called Durhamstown - which over the centuries was spelt variously as 'Dormstown', 'Durmstown' and 'Dorreanstown'). None of these have surviving churches, as all were destroyed during the Reformation and the Penal period. Some old graveyards do survive, notably at Moyaher, which contains rare surviving examples of pre-Irish Great Famine gravestones and their unique carvings. The remains of cemetery at Markiestown, (a large mound in the centre of a very large field) having survived the reformation and the famine, was controversially bulldozed in the 1970s to create land for tillage.

Decline in the Church of Ireland community

Disestablishment and land reform
The Ardbraccan/Bohermeen area contained a thriving Protestant community until the early twentieth century. However a series of unrelated economic, social and religious changes led to the large-scale disappearance of the Church of Ireland community.

These changes included the disestablishment of the Church of Ireland in 1869 which undermined the financial viability of the Church of Ireland Bishop of Meath's landed estate and led to the laying off of his mainly Protestant staff and the land reforms of the 1880s to the early 1900s, which saw the breakup of the large Protestant estates such as the Waller estate at Allenstown House, and their sale to their Catholic tenantry, again costing many local Protestants their jobs running the estates.

The Great War and Ne Temere

The impact of the First World War, when many Irish Protestant families lost some or all of their sons at Ypres and the Somme left large numbers of families without heirs and Protestant daughters without Protestant potential husbands, had a devastating impact, an impact augmented separately by Pope Pius X's Ne Temere decree, which demanded that all children of Catholic-Protestant marriages be brought up as Catholic (previously, the tradition had been that the boys would be brought up in the religion of their father, the girls in the religion of their mothers). This resulted in a situation where a marriage of a Protestant to a Catholic meant the end of the Protestant line in the family.

In addition, The Troubles during the Irish War of Independence lead many Protestants, who had identified with the ancien regime of British rule in Dublin Castle to move to the United Kingdom. A combination of changing economic structures, changing class structures, changing religious structures, changing political structures, changing marriage patterns and the First World War produced a terminal decline in the numbers of Protestants in the area. Whereas once the Protestant community counted among its number one bishop, two churches, all the landed gentry, many of their staff and a local rector, as well as a local Protestant primary school, all have gone, with the ancient St. Ultan's Church of Ireland in Ardbraccan ceasing to be used for Divine Service in 1981. One of the last members of the Church of Ireland in the locality, the former owner of Durhamstown Castle, Samuel McClelland, died in 2002.     Members of his family still reside in Durhamstown to this day.

Today

In the mid-1980s the former owner of Ardbraccan House, Colonel Foster, decided to repair the dangerously decayed roof on the thousand-year-old church spire at the deconsecrated Anglican Church, local timber merchants supplied timber for the work free of charge, along with staff to do the reroofing. When Colonel and Mrs Foster, who had moved into the old schoolhouse at the entrance to the Anglican Church grounds, decided to take on the task of restoring the derelict cemetery, in which both Anglican and Catholic people from the area were buried, the local Catholic parish joined the efforts, offering resources and manpower. The communities sought and received state assistance so that the historic burial ground could be fully restored and preserved.

Just as its nearest town, Navan, has become a dormitory town to Dublin 30 miles away, so it has become a collection of dormitory townlands to Navan, which itself is expected within a generation to reach city size. Whereas most of its employment was once farm-based, over 40% now would in urban centres, Trim, Kells, Navan and Dublin, commuting long distances.

A controversial new M3 motorway linking the towns of Cavan and Kells with Dublin cut through farmland within sight of Ardbraccan House and the ancient monastery site in Ardbraccan, before slicing through the archaeologically sensitive site of Tara, the capital of Ireland under the Árd Rí (High King of Ireland) in mediaeval times.

Though the route of the motorway at Tara has been the subject of an international outcry from academics, historians, environmentalists and others, the Irish government under the then Taoiseach Bertie Ahern and his successor Brian Cowan, publicly supported the plans, and condemned those who criticise them. A legal challenge was planned to try to force the National Roads Authority to select an alternative route.

St. Ultans Ladies Football Club have won the Meath Senior Championship on three occasions. The most recent of these wins came on 28 September 2015 after an epic final replay in Carlonstown against Oldcastle Ladies watched by an estimated 1500 people. To date, it is the largest ever attendance of a ladies club match in Co. Meath.

See also
 Ardbraccan
 Ardbraccan House
 Allenstown House
 Book of Kells
 Dean Cogan
 Diocese of Meath
 Navan
 Niall of the Nine Hostages
 Tara, Ireland

Civil parishes of County Meath
19th-century establishments in Ireland